Bugsy, also known as The King of Chicago, is a 1986 graphic adventure game for the Commodore 64, Amstrad CPC, and ZX Spectrum developed by St. Bride's School and published by CRL Group exclusively in Europe. Its protagonist, Bugsy Maroon, is a rabbit gangster in 1922 Chicago. The objective of the game is to be a successful criminal. While primarily text-based, it features simple graphics depicting the current scene.

References

External links
 
 
 
 

1980s interactive fiction
1986 video games
Amstrad CPC games
Commodore 64 games
CRL Group games
Single-player video games
Video games about crime
Video games about rabbits and hares
Video games developed in Ireland
Video games set in Chicago
Video games set in the 1920s
ZX Spectrum games